The Denison Railroaders were a minor league baseball franchise based in Denison, Texas, from 1915 to 1917 that competed in the Western Association. The city of Denison had previously hosted a franchise in the Texas–Oklahoma League for three seasons, which in 1914 was known as the Denison Champions.

The Railroaders were managed for all three seasons by Babe Peebles, who had also managed in Denison in 1913 and 1914.

Multiple players of the Railroaders had spent time in, or would later spend time in, Major League Baseball. These include: Tex Covington, Jerry D'Arcy, Rogers Hornsby, Clarence Huber, Ray Jansen, Walt Kinney, Fred Nicholson, Farmer Ray, Kid Speer, and Doc Watson.

References

Baseball teams established in 1915
Baseball teams disestablished in 1917
1915 establishments in Texas
1917 disestablishments in Texas
Defunct baseball teams in Texas
Defunct minor league baseball teams
Grayson County, Texas
Defunct Western Association teams